WiBro (wireless broadband) is a wireless broadband Internet technology developed by the South Korean telecoms industry. WiBro is the South Korean service name for IEEE 802.16e (mobile WiMAX) international standard. By the end of 2012, the Korean Communications Commission intends to increase WiBro broadband connection speeds to 10Mbit/s, around ten times the 2009 speed, which will complement their 1Gbit/s fibre-optic network.  The WiBro networks were shut down at the end of 2018.

WiBro adopts TDD for duplexing, OFDMA for multiple access and 8.75/10.00 MHz as a channel bandwidth. WiBro was devised to overcome the data rate limitation of mobile phones (for example CDMA 1x) and to add mobility to broadband Internet access (for example ADSL or Wireless LAN). In February 2002, the Korean government allocated 100 MHz of electromagnetic spectrum in the 2.3–2.4 GHz band, and in late 2004 WiBro Phase 1 was standardized by the TTA of Korea and in late 2005 ITU reflected WiBro as IEEE 802.16e (mobile WiMAX). Two South Korean telecom companies (KT, SKT) launched commercial service in June 2006, and the monthly fees were around US$30.

WiBro base stations offer an aggregate data throughput of 30 to 50 Mbit/s per carrier and cover a radius of 1–5 km allowing for the use of portable internet usage. In detail, it provides mobility for moving devices up to 120 km/h (74.5 mi/h)  compared to Wireless LAN having mobility up to walking speed and mobile phone technologies having mobility up to 250 km/h. From testing during the APEC Summit in Busan in late 2005, the actual range and bandwidth were quite a bit lower than these numbers. The technology will also offer quality of service. The inclusion of QoS allows for WiBro to stream video content and other loss-sensitive data in a reliable manner. These all appear to be (and may be) the stronger advantages over the fixed WiMAX standard (802.16a). Some Telcos in many countries were trying to commercialize this Mobile WiMAX (or WiBro). For example, TI (Italy), TVA (Brazil), Omnivision (Venezuela), PORTUS (Croatia), and Arialink (Michigan) provided commercial service at some stage. While WiBro is quite precise in its requirements from spectrum use to equipment design, WiMAX leaves much of this up to the equipment provider while providing enough detail to ensure interoperability between designs.

WiBro has a Peak Download speed of 128 Mbit/s and a Peak Upload speed of 56 Mbit/s.

Current service
In Korea, KT (Korea Telecom) offers Wave 2 (18.4 Mbit/s, 4 Mbit/s) for 10000 KRW/mo (around $11 or €6.50) with 10 GB data usage to 40000 KRW/mo with 50 GB data usage plus free access to their own WiFi hotspots, ollehWiFi. The service coverage is advertised as nationwide, but actual coverage is restricted to every city, some railroad station, airports, and major highways. SK Telecom also offers Wave 2 WiBro Service for $18.87 a month with 30 GB data usage. Actual service coverage is limited mostly to major cities and highways.

For short term visitors, KT rents WiBro modem and bridge at KT Roaming Center in Incheon International Airport. As of October 2012, WiBro-only USB modem costs 5,000 KRW per day plus 100,000 KRW deposit, WiBro-HSPA USB modem and WiBro Egg cost 8,000 KRW per day plus 150,000 KRW deposit. One-day rent is free at KT Roaming Center, and requires credit card and passport.

In India, Tikona Digital Networks (Independent services provider) offers WiBro service for up to 2 Mbit/s and 4 Mbit/s in many cities. The 2 Mbit/s unlimited monthly plan costs Rs. 999.00 (roughly $21).

Coverage
As of January 2013, KT covers all 80+ cities while SK covers Seoul and a few other major cities in South Korea.

Wibro Manufactures
 HTC - HTC Evo 4G+
 INFOMARK - Compact Egg (Mobile router)
 Interbro - Egg (A mobile Wibro to Wi-Fi hotspot device brand)
 Intel - Wibro Netbook
 LG Innotek - Egg, USB Type Modem
 Modacom - Egg
 Myungmin - USB Type Modem
 Samsung - USB Type Modem, Wibro 3G phone (SCH-M830, Show Wibro Omnia)
 Iphone4 - USIM

Network deployment

In November 2004, Intel and Samsung Electronics executives agreed to ensure compatibility between WiBro and Mobile WiMAX technology. KT Corporation, SK Telecom and Hanaro Telecom (acquired by SK Telecom and renamed SK Broadband) had been selected as Wibro operators in January, 2005. However, Hanaro Telecom cancelled its plan for the WiBro and returned WiBro licence in April 2005. In September 2005, Samsung Electronics signed a deal with Sprint Nextel Corporation to provide equipment for a WiBro trial. Two months later, KT Corporation (aka Korea Telecom) showed off WiBro trial services during the Asia-Pacific Economic Cooperation (APEC) summit in Busan. On February 10, 2006, Telecom Italia, the dominant telephony and internet service provider in Italy, together with Korean Samsung Electronics, has demonstrated to the public a WiBro network service on the occasion of the 2006 Winter Olympics, held in Turin, with downlink speed of 10 Mbit/s and uplink speed of some hundreds of kbit/s even in movement up to 120 km/h. In the same event Samsung tlc div. president Kitae Lee assured a future of 20–30 Mbit/s by the end of this year (2006) and >100 Mbit/s down/>1 Mbit/s up in 2008. KT Corporation launched commercial WiBro service in June 2006. Sprint (US), BT (UK), KDDI (JP), and TVA (BR) have or are trialing WiBro. KT Corporation and SK Telecom launched WiBro around Seoul on June 30, 2006. On April 3, 2007, KT launched WiBro coverage for all areas of Seoul including all subway lines. In January 2011, KT's mobile network SHOW and home network QOOK merged. Since then, KT has been changed to olleh. In March, 2011, olleh's WiBro coverage was expanded nationwide covering 85% of Koreans. As of October 2012, olleh's Wibro covers 88% of the South Korean population.

See also 
 Digital Multimedia Broadcasting (DMB)
 HIPERMAN
 IEEE 802.16
 WiMAX
 Wireless Internet Protocol
 Yota Egg (nearly identical to the WiBro Egg)

References

External links 
WiBro Website (in English)
Korea Telecom's WiBro site (in Korean) 
PDF file: 2.3 GHz Portable Internet (WiBro) for Wireless Broadband Access
WiMAX: Opportunity or Hype? (a paper presented at the ITERA 2006 academic conference discussing WiBro and WiMAX)
News report discussing WiBro technology 
News article about an alliance between SK Telecom and Hanaro Telecom for WiBro rollout
News report about the LG/Intel agreement
TTA (Telecommunications Technology Association) of Korea
South Korea Pushes Mobile Broadband
WiBro, HSDPA Providers Vying for Future Markets

Broadband
IEEE standards
WiMAX
Korean inventions
2002 establishments in South Korea
2006 establishments in South Korea
2018 disestablishments in South Korea
Products introduced in 2006
Products and services discontinued in 2018